Alfta is a locality situated in Ovanåker Municipality, Gävleborg County, Sweden with 2,465 inhabitants in 2020.

Notable people
 

Martin Hellgren (born 1991), Swedish professional ice hockey player

References 

Populated places in Ovanåker Municipality
Hälsingland